Ilya Petrovich Shtemler ( Izrail Pinkhusovich Shtemler; ; 18 January 1933 – 3 December 2022) was a Soviet and Russian writer.

Biography 
Shtemler was born in Baku on 18 January 1933. He graduated from the Baku Industrial Institute in 1957, and then worked as an engineer, first in the oil industry in the Volga region and then in the "Geologorazvedka" factory in Leningrad, the city which eventually became his second home. Shtemler's novels Univermag (The Department Store), Poezd (Train), and Utrennee shosse (Morning highway) are assertively realistic description of the life in 1960s, 70s, and 80s Russia. His first novel, The Grandmaster's Mark, was published in 1965 by Yunost and brought immediate recognition to its author. Shtemler was an active campaigner for the protection of Russian historical heritage. In 2006, he became vice-president of the St. Petersburg division of the PEN club.

Death
Shtemler died from COVID-19 in Saint Petersburg on 3 December 2022, at the age of 89.

References

External links
Ilya Shtemler @ ozon.ru 
Article about Ilya Shtemler @ Neva literary magazine 

1933 births
2022 deaths
20th-century Russian male writers
Russian male novelists
Soviet writers
Recipients of the Medal of the Order "For Merit to the Fatherland" II class
Writers from Baku
Azerbaijan State Oil and Industry University alumni
Deaths from the COVID-19 pandemic in Russia
Jewish Russian writers